Reinhold Hammerstein (9 April 1915 – 22 April 2010) was a German musicologist.

Life and career 
After his Abitur, he studied musicology, history and German studies at the University of Freiburg and the Ludwig Maximilian University of Munich. In 1940 he obtained the Academic Degree of Dr. phil. In addition he completed an education in piano and singing.

During the Second World War he served as a soldier in Russia, but was dismissed from military service as incurably ill due to a severe dysentery. He spent the end of the war in 1944/45 in Tengen at Lake Constance. In 1946 he was assigned lecturer of music history at the Musikhochschule Freiburg, a position he held until 1958. In 1954 his habilitation qualified him as private lecturer of musicology at the University of Freiburg im Breisgau, where he was appointed extraordinary professor in 1962. Between 1955 and 1956 he also held a visiting scholar position at the University of Basel. In 1963, Hammerstein accepted the call for a full professorship in musicology at the Ruprecht-Karls-Universität Heidelberg, which he held until his [retirement] in 1980

Hammerstein, who expanded the field of musicology to include iconography, married Dr. Irmgard Hueck, born in 1943, with whom he had three children. He died in 2010, at the age of 95, in Freiburg im Breisgau. One of his brothers is the historian Notker Hammerstein.

Further reading 
 Werner Schuder (edit.): Kürschners Deutscher Gelehrten-Kalender, volume 1, 13th edition, De Gruyter: Berlin, New York, 1980. . .
 August Ludwig Degener, Walter Habel: : das Deutsche who's who, volume 42, Verlag Schmidt-Römhild, 2003. . .
 , volume 11, December 2005; . .
 Wilhelm Seidel: Ikonograph der Musik; Zum Tod von Reinhold Hammerstein In: Badische Zeitung 28 April 2010, retrieved 20 October 2012

 Publications 
 Christian Friedrich Daniel Schubart, ein schwäbisch-alemannischer Dichter-Musiker der Goethezeit, Dissertation 1943
 Die Musik der Engel : Untersuchungen zur Musikanschauung des Mittelalters, Habilitationsschrift, Francke, Bern, Munich, 1962
 Die Musik in Dantes Divina Commedia In Deutsches Dante-Jahrbuch 41/42, 1964 
 Tanz und Musik des Todes. Die mittelalterlichen Totentänze und ihr Nachleben. Francke, Bern 1980, .
 Macht und Klang : tönende Automaten als Realität und Fiktion in der alten und mittelalterlichen Welt, Francke, Bern, 1986
 Von gerissenen Saiten und singenden Zikaden : Studien zur Emblematik der Musik, Francke, Tübingen, Basel, 1994
 Die Stimme aus der anderen Welt : über die Darstellung des Numinosen in der Oper von Monteverdi bis Mozart, Schneider, Tutzing, 1998

References

External links 
 
 

German musicologists
German music historians
Academic staff of the Hochschule für Musik Freiburg
Academic staff of the University of Freiburg
Academic staff of Heidelberg University
1915 births
2010 deaths
People from Mühlheim am Main